Dobrin Orlovski (born 22 August 1981) is a Bulgarian footballer who currently plays for Atletik Kuklen as a midfielder.

In 2002, he was a member of Bulgaria national under-21 football team.

Playing career 
Orlovski began his career with PFC Lokomotiv Plovdiv in the A Group. During his time in the A Group he played with PFC Botev Plovdiv, Belasitsa Petrich, and Vihren Sandanski. For the remainder of his career in Bulgaria he spent time with FC Spartak Plovdiv, OFC Nesebar, POFC Rakovski, FC Oborishte, and FC Gigant Saedinenie in the B Grupa. In 2015, he went overseas to Canada to sign with expansion franchise Scarborough SC of the Canadian Soccer League.

References

External links

 footmercato profile

1981 births
Living people
Footballers from Plovdiv
Association football midfielders
Bulgarian footballers
Bulgaria under-21 international footballers
PFC Lokomotiv Plovdiv players
PFC Belasitsa Petrich players
Botev Plovdiv players
PFC Nesebar players
FC Oborishte players
First Professional Football League (Bulgaria) players
Second Professional Football League (Bulgaria) players
Scarborough SC players
Canadian Soccer League (1998–present) players
Bulgarian expatriates in Canada
Bulgarian expatriate footballers
Expatriate soccer players in Canada